David Blair may refer to:
 David Blair (dancer) (1932–1975), British ballet dancer
 David Blair (director), British movie and TV director
 David Blair (encyclopedist) (1820–1899), Irish Australian journalist and encyclopedist
 David Blair (filmmaker), American experimental filmmaker
 David Blair (golfer) (1917–1985), Scottish amateur golfer
 David Blair (information technologist) (1947–2011), information retrieval scientist
 David Blair (journalist) (born 1973), British journalist working for The Daily Telegraph
 David Blair (mariner) (1874–1955), British second officer, transferred off the Titanic
 David Blair (track and field) (born 1975), American Paralympic discus thrower
 David Blair (physicist) (born 1946), Australian physicist
 David Blair (rower) (born 1991), Canadian Paralmypic rower and triathlete
 David Blair (rugby union) (born 1985), Scottish rugby player
 Blair (poet) (David Blair, 1967–2011), American performance poet
 David H. Blair (1868–1945), Commissioner of Internal Revenue, 1921–1929
 David Blair Motorsports, a former NASCAR racing team
 Rev. David Blair, a pen name of Eliza Fenwick (1767–1840)